Joseph L. McKeown pronounced Mick-Q-ann (born May 12, 1956), is the head women's basketball coach at Northwestern University.

Career
He has 600 wins as of November 21, 2014. He won the Atlantic 10 Conference's coach of the year award a record 5 times during his tenure at George Washington, and has also received the same honor once in the Big Ten Conference. McKeown remains George Washington's all-time leading coach in terms of wins and winning percentage. His teams have reached the postseason 19 times, with a 20th postseason trip all but certain in 2020.

In the 1991–1992 season, he led the Colonials to a national ranking of 6th, which is the program's highest ranking ever. From 1991 to 1998, the team posted eight consecutive 20 win seasons including 5 Atlantic 10 titles. In 2007, he led the team to a 28–4 record, breaking school records for wins and winning percentage. He previously served as an assistant coach at Kent State, and Oklahoma.

In 1986, he was named head women's basketball coach at New Mexico State. He posted a 68–20 record over there. He was a star basketball player at Kent State, and was named co-captain during his senior season. He holds the school record for assists in a game with 15.

McKeown left George Washington after the 2007–2008 season.  He and his family moved to Chicago to find better healthcare and services for his son with autism.  Since 2008, he has been the head women's basketball coach at Northwestern University. McKeown was named Big Ten Coach of the Year in 2020 when the Wildcats, who had not been picked to finish in the league's top five in the preseason by league coaches and media and had been tapped by an ESPN panel to finish anywhere from 7th to 12th in the 14-team league, shared the Big Ten regular-season title with Maryland.

USA Basketball
McKeown was selected to be the head coach of the USA representative to the World University Games held in Seoul, South Korea July 5–13, 2015. The team won all six games, including the championship game against Canada. The first three quarters the game were quite close with four ties and four lead changes. In the fourth quarter the USA exploded for 34 points to pull out to a large lead, and won the gold-medal with a score of 82–63.

Head coaching record

References

External links
 Northwestern bio
George Washington bio

1956 births
Living people
American men's basketball players
American women's basketball coaches
Basketball coaches from Pennsylvania
Basketball players from Philadelphia
George Washington Colonials women's basketball coaches
Junior college men's basketball players in the United States
Kent State Golden Flashes men's basketball players
Kent State Golden Flashes women's basketball coaches
New Mexico State Aggies women's basketball coaches
Northwestern Wildcats women's basketball coaches
Oklahoma Sooners women's basketball coaches